Basketball was one of the many sports which was held at the 1998 Asian Games in Bangkok, Thailand between 8 December and 19 December 1998. China again swept all their assignments en route to their 5th title in the men's tournament, while Japan notched their 2nd title after thrashing China in the women's final.

Medalists

Medal table

Final standing

Men

Women

References
Men's Results
Women's Results

External links
XIII Asian Games Basketball
13th Asian Games Men's Basketball

 
Basketball
1998
1998–99 in Asian basketball
International basketball competitions hosted by Thailand